Sister Act 2: Back in the Habit is a 1993 American musical comedy film, directed by Bill Duke, and released by Touchstone Pictures. It is the sequel to the 1992 film Sister Act, and is loosely based on the life of Crenshaw High School choir instructor Iris Stevenson. The story sees Whoopi Goldberg reprising her role as Deloris van Cartier, as she finds herself coming to the aid of her nun friends who need her help to save her old school. Maggie Smith, Kathy Najimy, Wendy Makkena, and Mary Wickes also reprised their roles in the sequel.

The film performed well at the box office, but was less commercially successful than its predecessor, and initially received generally negative reviews from critics. However it has proved popular with fans and has become a cult classic. It starred Lauryn Hill in her breakout role, as well as Sheryl Lee Ralph, Alanna Ubach, Jennifer Love Hewitt, and Ryan Toby.

Plot
Deloris Van Cartier has become a famous performer in Las Vegas since her time posing as a nun to hide from the mob, presenting an entire dinner show based on her experience. During her latest performance, she is reunited with her friends, Sisters Mary Patrick, Mary Robert, and Mary Lazarus, who are in the audience. They have come to Las Vegas to beg her assistance.

Deloris meets with another old friend, the Reverend Mother, who explains that the convent nuns now teach at the St. Francis Academy in San Francisco. Coincidentally, Deloris attended this school in her childhood. The school faces closure unless its reputation can be improved. The nuns ask her to reprise her persona as Sister Mary Clarence and become the new music teacher. She reluctantly agrees.

At the school, Mary Clarence meets the school's staff of friars, led by the humble but inept Father Maurice, and the diocese administrator, Mr. Crisp, who wants the school to close, so he may receive early retirement. She attends her first music class, meeting the rowdy teenagers, who attend the class with the expectation of receiving an easy "A". Mary Clarence butts heads with ringleader, Rita Louise Watson. Rita walks out when Mary Clarence informs the students that they will have to earn their grades. The other students stay to avoid failure. When they break into spontaneous, synchronized singing, Mary Clarence is inspired to turn them into a choir. Initially, the students are dismayed and object to her proposal.

Mary Robert overhears Rita's talented singing. She recommends that Mary Clarence convince Rita to return to class. Students, nuns and friars work to restore the school's decrepit music room, and the class begins to practice extensively. They perform "Oh, Happy Day" before the whole school, led by Ahmal, a talented vocalist. The nuns discover numerous trophies, revealing the school won the All-State Choir Championship multiple times in the past, and decide to enter them once again. Father Maurice allows it, as long as they raise the money themselves and each student has a signed parental permission slip.

Rita's strict but well-meaning mother Florence refuses to let her attend, believing a musical career is a dead end as her husband died trying to chase fame. However, Rita forges her mother's signature to attend, leaving an apology note for her disobedience, prompting Florence to drive to Hollywood to see the competition. Mr. Crisp discovers a magazine in the school library with Deloris Van Cartier on the cover. Recognizing her as Mary Clarence, he warns Father Maurice of the sham. The choir has already left for the competition, so the friars pile into their old van and race to confront Mary Clarence.

Backstage at the competition, the choir are intimidated by the other entrants and consider quitting, but Mary Clarence inspires them to persevere. The friars arrive, and Father Maurice decides to support the choir upon seeing their enthusiasm. The other friars trap Mr. Crisp in a closet to prevent him from interfering. The choir takes to the stage, Rita performing a solo before the choir perform an urban contemporary gospel rendition of "Joyful, Joyful", with hip hop choreography.

The choir wins the competition. Impressed with the performance, the school's local diocese agrees to keep the school open. To thwart Mr. Crisp, the Reverend Mother states that the competition entry was his idea, and that the diocese must have another "hot spot" position for him..."we cannot let such a prize bull be put out to pasture".

Rita and Florence make amends, while the choir learns Mary Clarence is actually a professional singer. They ask her if she is a Las Vegas showgirl, to which she claims she has never been such, but is a "headliner".

The end credits feature the film's cast performing "Ain't No Mountain High Enough".

Cast

Reception

Box office
The film was not as successful as Sister Act. It grossed $57.3 million in the United States and Canada and $67.3 million internationally for a worldwide total of $124.6 million, against a $38 million budget.

Critical response
On Rotten Tomatoes, the film has an 18% approval rating based on 38 reviews, with an average rating of 3.6/10. The consensus states: "Sister Act is off-key in this reprise, fatally shifting the spotlight from Whoopi Goldberg to a less compelling ensemble of pupils and trading its predecessor's sharp comedy for unconvincing sentiment." On Metacritic it has a score of 38% based on reviews from 23 critics, indicating "generally unfavorable reviews". Audiences polled by CinemaScore gave the film an average grade of "A−" on an A+ to F scale.

Roger Ebert of the Chicago Sun-Times rated it 2 out of 4 and wrote "What's strange about Sister Act 2: Back in the Habit is that it abandons most of what people liked about the first movie and replaces it with a formula as old as the hills."
Brian Lowry of Variety wrote that it "Lacks the charm and buoyancy that made the first "Act" a mass-appeal hit."
Rita Kempley of The Washington Post called it "Shamelessly contrived pap."

Ty Burr of Entertainment Weekly criticized the lack of originality but says "The recycling’s so cheerily blatant it almost short- circuits criticism" and "What saves the movie is a young cast with astonishing talent and energy: You respond to their high spirits more than to the hackneyed characters they play." He gave the film a B− grade.

The film gained a strong following since its release and became a cult classic among fans. 
Director Bill Duke said about the reception: "The reviewers at that time could not really be linked to our communities or the message. As you know, the faces of the reviewers were very different than the viewers. So I was surprised, but not shocked, because they didn't get us at the time. They didn't get the message and did not relate on an emotional level."

Awards
Goldberg was nominated for an MTV Movie Award for Best Comedic Performance.

Soundtrack
The soundtrack album was  released on November 23, 1993 by Hollywood Records, it  reached #74 on the Billboard Top 200 Albums Chart and #40 on the Billboard Top R&B/Hip-Hop Albums charts and received a Gold certification from the RIAA for shipment of 500,000 copies on March 26, 1996.
 Greatest Medley Ever Told – Whoopi Goldberg & The Ronelles
 Never Should've Let You Go – Hi-Five
 Get Up Offa That Thing/Dancing in the Street – Whoopi Goldberg
 Oh Happy Day – St. Francis Choir featuring Ryan Toby
 Ball of Confusion (That's What the World Is Today) – Whoopi Goldberg & the Sisters
 His Eye Is on the Sparrow – Tanya Blount & Lauryn Hill
 A Deeper Love – Aretha Franklin & Lisa Fischer
 Wandering Eyes – Nuttin' Nyce
 Pay Attention – Valeria Andrews & Ryan Toby
 Ode to Joy – Chapman College Choir
 Joyful, Joyful – St. Francis Choir featuring Lauryn Hill
 Ain't No Mountain High Enough – Whoopi Goldberg & Cast

The finale performance of "Joyful Joyful" was produced and arranged by Mervyn Warren, noted jazz and gospel musician who is best known as an original member of a cappella vocal group Take 6. The arrangement also includes rap lyrics written by Ryan Toby, and a bridge adapted from the chorus of Janet Jackson's 1986 single, What Have You Done for Me Lately.

Home media
The all-region Blu-ray, including both Sister Act and Sister Act 2: Back in the Habit, was released on June 19, 2012 with both films presented in 1080p. The 3-disc set also includes both films on DVD with the same bonus features as previous releases.

Sequel
When asked in 2013 about acting in a sequel, Whoopi Goldberg initially refused, but by 2015 changed her stance to a maybe. After a Broad City cameo, in 2016 Whoopi expressed doubts about a sequel based on missing cast members, but said she thought it would be fun and likeable. In May 2017, she affirmed her desire for the third film to happen, adding in July that she would like to direct it and had confidence it would be made. On December 7, 2018, it was confirmed that Regina Y. Hicks and Karin Gist were hired to write the script to Sister Act 3 for a release on Disney+. In December 2020, it was announced that Goldberg would be reprising the role of Deloris and serve as a producer alongside Tyler Perry.

References

External links

 
 
 

1993 films
1990s musical comedy films
1990s musical films
American musical comedy films
American children's comedy films
American children's musical films
American sequel films
Films about Catholic nuns
Films about educators
Films directed by Bill Duke
Films produced by Scott Rudin
Films set in San Francisco
Films shot in Los Angeles
Films shot in San Francisco
Films shot in the Las Vegas Valley
Touchstone Pictures films
1993 comedy films
Religious comedy films
Films scored by Marc Shaiman
Films scored by Miles Goodman
Films produced by Dawn Steel
1990s high school films
1990s English-language films
1990s American films